Il ragazzo più felice del mondo is a 2018 comedy-mockumentary film directed by Gipi.

The film premiered at the 75th Venice International Film Festival on 1 September 2018 and was released in theatres the next 8 November.

Cast

The film includes cameos of cartoonists Emiliano Mammucari, Giacomo Nanni, Laura Scarpa, Margherita Tramutoli, comic book editor and publisher Francesco Coniglio, and the band Campos. The theatre ensemble "Sacchi di sabbia" (Giovanni Guerrieri, Gabriele Carli, Giulia Gallo, Vincenzo Illiano) plays the cavemen.

References

External links

2018 films
2010s Italian-language films
2018 comedy films
Italian comedy films
Italian mockumentary films
Films shot in Tuscany
Films about comics
2010s Italian films
Fandango (Italian company) films